Wan Chai Gap is a gap in Wan Chai District, Hong Kong Island, in Hong Kong.

The Hong Kong Police Museum is located at Wan Chai Gap. It is housed in the former Wan Chai Gap Police Station, located at 27 Coombe Road.

See also

 List of gaps in Hong Kong
 Aberdeen Country Park
 Hong Kong Trail
 Magazine Gap Road

Gaps of Hong Kong
Wan Chai District